The German power metal band Powerwolf has released eight studio albums, four live albums, two video albums, three EPs, three box sets, two compilation albums, eighteen singles, and seventeen music videos.

Albums

Studio albums

Live albums

Compilation albums

Box sets

Extended plays

Singles

Videography

Video albums

Music videos

Notes

References 

Powerwolf
Heavy metal group discographies
Discographies of German artists